Chenia may refer to:
 Chenia (worm), a worm genus in the family Derogenidae
 Chenia (plant), a moss genus in the family Pottiaceae